USS Spitfire was the former Baltimore privateer Grampus that the United States Navy purchased. She was a heavily armed schooner built for service in the War of 1812, but did not see service until the Barbary Wars when she was sent with the American fleet to the Mediterranean to force an end to piracy of American ships.

Privateer
Grampuss captain was John Murphy. She was commissioned as a privateer on 12 February 1813.

As a privateer she captured or recaptured eight vessels:
Catherine & William, brig, lost at sea	
Eclipse, brig, sent in
Ceres, brig, burnt	
Expedition, ketch, New York
Doris, brig, transport, Marblehead	
Speculator, brig, divested, given up
Dry Harbor, schooner, sent in
Brig, burnt

Purchased for the War of 1812 
The third ship to be named Spitfire by the U.S. Navy, Spitfire was purchased at Baltimore, Maryland, about 21 December 1814 for service in a squadron commanded by Commodore David Porter which was to operate out of southern American ports against British shipping in the West Indies. However, the Treaty of Ghent ended the second American war with the United Kingdom (UK) before Porter could get the squadron to sea.

Assigned to the Barbary Wars 

However, as the United States ended war with the UK, it was reopening hostilities with Algiers. As a result, the ships acquired for Porter's commerce raiding squadron were assigned to a squadron assembled for operations against the Barbary pirates, commanded by Commodore Stephen Decatur. 

Spitfire departed New York City with the squadron 20 May 1815, and sailed to the Mediterranean. On 19 June, she helped Epervier, Spark, and Torch to chase Estedio ashore at Cape Palos and capture that Algerian brig. 

Spitfire then sailed with the squadron to Algiers where its presence forced the Dey to agree to American terms. 

The squadron then sailed, in turn, to Tunis and Tripoli and successfully demanded indemnities for violations of treaties with the United States during the recent American war with the UK.

In September, Spitfire headed home and was laid up until she was sold 3 April 1816.

References
 
 Cranwell, John Philips, & William Bowers Crane (1940) Men of marque; a history of private armed vessels out of Baltimore during the War of 1812. (New York, W.W. Norton & Co.). 

1812 ships
Ships built in Baltimore
Privateer ships of the United States
War of 1812 ships of the United States
Barbary Wars American ships
Schooners of the United States Navy
1814 ships